Kiribati competed at the 2011 Pacific Games in Nouméa, New Caledonia between August 27 and September 10, 2011. As of June 28, 2011, Kiribati had listed 74 competitors.

Athletics

Kiribati has qualified 3 athletes.

Men
Raobu Tarawa

Women
Kaingauee David
Taatia Riino

Badminton

Kiribati has qualified 2 athletes.

Men
Riteti Mannarara

Women
Tinabora Tekeiaki

Boxing

Kiribati has qualified 7 athletes.

Men
Kautoa Roddy
Ratu Teanti
Kaotinrerei Tebakatu
Andrew Kometa
Ataniraoi Ioteba
Tarieta Ruata -  -91 kg
Kiaen Buakaua

Football

Kiribati has qualified a men's team.  Each team can consist of a maximum of 21 athletes.

Men
Tarariki Tarotu
Tiaon Miika
Kaake Kamta
Enri Tenukai
Nabaruru Batiri
Antin Nanotaake
Jeff Jong
Joseph Yan
Beniamina Kaintikuaba
Karotu Bakaane
Martin Miriata
Biitamatang Keakea
Tongarua Akori

Powerlifting

Kiribati has qualified 1 athlete.

Men
Ioane Marae

Surfing

Kiribati has qualified 1 athlete.

Men
Nicholas McDermott

Tennis

Kiribati has qualified 2 athletes.

Men
Tabera Bonteman
Tebatibunga Tito

Weightlifting

Kiribati has qualified 2 athletes.

Men
Toromon Tekenibeia -  -77 kg Snatch,  -77 kg Clean & Jerk,  -77 kg Total
Bob Kabuati

References

Pac
Nations at the 2011 Pacific Games
Kiribati at the Pacific Games